Streptomyces huasconensis is a haloalkalitolerant bacterium species from the genus of Streptomyces which has been isolated from Salar del Huasco.

See also 
 List of Streptomyces species

References 

huasconensis
Bacteria described in 2019